Property Is No Longer a Theft is a 1973 comedy film directed by Elio Petri. It was entered into the 23rd Berlin International Film Festival.

Plot
Total, a young bank cashier, sees his life, with its grey, dismal prospects, as disappointing. He envies the wealth of many of his clients, often accumulated though criminal or corrupt activities.

After surviving an armed robbery, he decides to start a new life, as a thief. Resigning from his job, he begins discreetly with small robberies in supermarkets, progressing to larger frauds, including of a former client, a butcher.

He enjoys the new clothes, new cars and new women but his neuroticism and social conscience pose problems.

Cast
 Ugo Tognazzi as The Butcher
 Flavio Bucci as Total
 Daria Nicolodi as Anita
 Salvo Randone as Total's father
 Mario Scaccia as Albertone
 Julien Guiomar as Bank director
 Jacques Herlin as Bank employee
 Gigi Proietti as Paco
 Orazio Orlando as Pirelli
 Ettore Garofolo as Bocio
 Gino Milli as Zaganè
 Cecilia Polizzi as Mafalda
 Luigi Antonio Guerra
 Ada Pometti

Release
Property is No Longer Theft was released on July 1, 1973. It was distributed by Titanus.

References

Sources

External links

1973 films
Italian comedy films
French comedy films
1970s Italian-language films
1973 comedy films
Films directed by Elio Petri
Films scored by Ennio Morricone
Films with screenplays by Ugo Pirro
1970s Italian films
1970s French films